Demolition Derby is the fourth album by folk guitarist Sandy Bull, released in 1972 through Vanguard Records. Songwriter Patti Smith, who was a known admirer of Bull's work, said "Even at its most 'cosmic,' Demolition Derby is still sleazy... juicy... American. Yeah it's a real cool record."

Accolades

Track listing

Personnel 
Sandy Bull – guitar, banjo, oud, vocals, production, mixing
Denis Charles – tabla on "Carnival Jump" and "Easy Does It"
Jeff Zaraya – engineering

External links

References 

1972 albums
Vanguard Records albums
Sandy Bull albums